Chernihiv (also given in the Soviet era as Chernigov) was an air base in Ukraine located 5 km north of Chernihiv.  It was a training base.  It was home to 701 UAP (701st Aviation Training Regiment) flying 101 Aero L-39C aircraft as of 1992.

The Chernihiv Military Aviation School of Pilots was activated on 6.11.40 in Chernihiv.
17.7.41 renamed Zernograd Military Aviation School of Pilots, but reverted to its old name 21.10.41.
5.12.44 awarded the Red Banner.
9.45 had five training squadrons (1st to 5th).
15.7.46 disbanded.
Reformed 15.2.51 at Chernihiv, Chernihiv Oblast, as the 57th Military Aviation School of Pilots.

Organisation 1960:
701st Training Aviation Regiment (Chernihiv, Chernihiv Oblast) with MiG-15 and Yak-18
702nd Training Aviation Regiment (Gorodnya, Chernihiv Oblast) with MiG-15 and Yak-18
703rd Training Aviation Regiment (Uman, Cherkassy Oblast) with MiG-15 and Yak-18

In 1963 the school was renamed Chernihiv Higher Military Aviation School of Pilots. In October 1968 the school received the official byname "Leninist Komsomol".

The school was subordinated to the:
 April 1964 – April 1968: VVS Kiev Military District
 April 1968 – June 1980: 17th Air Army
 June 1980 – May 1988: VVS Kiev Military District
 May 1988 – January 1992: 17th Air Army

In early 1992 the school was taken over by the government of Ukraine.

Gallery

References

Soviet Air Force bases
Ukrainian airbases
Buildings and structures in Chernihiv